Pachuvum Kovalanum is a 2011 Indian Malayalam-language film directed by Thaha, starring Mukesh, Suraj Venjaramood, Meghna Raj and Jyothirmayi in the lead roles.

Plot

The film producer of a serial is killed during its shooting. The director is accused of it as he is the producer's son-in-law.

Cast
 Mukesh as Pachu
 Suraj Venjaramood as Kovalan
 Nelson as Kuttappan
 Meghna Raj as Sukanya
 Jyothirmayi as Wife
 Jagathi Sreekumar as Producer
 Riyaz Khan as Police officer
 Innocent as Bhadranpillai
 Shivaji Guruvayoor as Production controller
 Kalpana as Chinna
 Narayanankutty
 Sona Nair as Anna
 Lakshmi Priya

References

External links
 Nowrunning article
 OneIndia article
 indiaglitz article

2010s Malayalam-language films
2011 comedy films
2011 films